Henry Victor Deligny (5 September 1855 - 2 January 1938) was a French divisional general who served in the First World War.

Biography
Deligny was born in Rennes in 1855, the son of Victor Valéry Deligny, a house painter, and Anne Émilie Gilles. He entered the Ecole Spéciale Militaire de Saint-Cyr on 27 October 1873.

Made a Lieutenant Colonel on 12 July 1903, he was second in command for the General Staff of the Second Army Corps. He became a Colonel on 23 June 1907, and was named Deputy Director of Studies at the École Supérieure de Guerre. On 23 March 1911, he was promoted to Brigadier General and put in charge of infantry operations for the Minister of War.

When the First World War broke out, he was promoted to Divisional General, and commanded the Second Infantry Division from 2 August 1914 until 8 September 1914. On 27 October 1914 he was put in charge of the 1st Army Corps at the First Battle of the Marne.

Injured three times, given two commendations, and specially remarked upon for his role in the Second Battle of the Aisne, Deligny received the Plaque de Grand Officier of the Legion of Honour on 30 November 1917.

From 18 December 1917 until 10 March 1919, he commanded the 3rd Military Region from Rouen.

Works 
 Instruction pratique sur les exercices de combat des troupes d'infanterie, par le commandant Deligny, H. Charles-Lavauzelle, 1898, 79 p.

Notes

External links
 Dossier on the Légion d'honneur of général Deligny.

Bibliography 
 « Le général Deligny », in Le Pays de France, no174, 14 février 1918, p. 3
 Bathélemy Edmond Palat, La grande guerre sur le front occidental, Chapelot, Paris, 1925
 Les armées françaises dans la grande guerre, Imprimerie nationale, 1927

1855 births
1938 deaths
French generals
French military personnel of World War I